Firmine Richard (born 25 September 1947 Pointe-à-Pitre, Guadeloupe, France) is a French actress. Her film credits include 8 Women and Hunting and Gathering.

Personal life
In February 2009, Richard took part in demonstrations in Paris in support of the 2009 French Caribbean general strikes in Guadeloupe and Martinique.

Theater

Filmography

References

External links 
 

1947 births
Living people
People from Pointe-à-Pitre
Guadeloupean actors
French film actresses
French television actresses
French people of Guadeloupean descent
European Film Award for Best Actress winners
Chevaliers of the Légion d'honneur
Officers of the Ordre national du Mérite
20th-century French actresses
21st-century French actresses